Black Bone is an album by American jazz trombonist and composer Craig Harris recorded in 1983 and released on the Italian Soul Note label.

Reception
The Allmusic review by Ron Wynn awarded the album 4 stars calling it an "Outstanding session" of "rousing, spirited originals".

Track listing
All compositions by Craig Harris
 "Homeland" - 7:10 
 "Blackwell" - 13:02 
 "Song for Psychedelic Souls" - 8:06 
 "September 10, 1953" - 3:58 
 "Conjure Man" - 6:58
Recorded at Greene Street Recording Studio in New York City on January 4, 12 & 13, 1983

Personnel
Craig Harris - trombone
George Adams - tenor saxophone 
Donald Smith - piano
Fred Hopkins - bass 
Charli Persip - drums

References 

Black Saint/Soul Note albums
Craig Harris albums
1983 albums